Valhalla Rising is a 2001 Clive Cussler book in the Dirk Pitt series.  The events depicted in the book take place between July and August 2003.

Plot summary
Dirk Pitt has to stop an evil CEO of an oil and natural gas company in the US from establishing absolute monopoly over oil resources and supplies.  It is a typical Dirk Pitt novel dealing with a countdown, bribed officials, and ruthless evil leaders.  Pitt also unravels the work of a brilliant, reclusive scientist who had made great advances in oil technology, traced the history and found the remains of a Viking settlement on the Hudson River; the scientist also discovered the remains of Captain Nemo's Nautilus and deciphered and improved its power system (a magnetohydrodynamic engine). The book climaxes with Dirk on the verge of proposing to his on-and-off girlfriend, U.S senator Loren Smith, when they are interrupted by the introduction of his children, Dirk and Summer Pitt, named after their father and mother respectively.

Trivia
After the cruise liner Emerald Dolphin sinks,  Pitt and  Giordino discuss about how the Titanic supposedly broke into two before sinking, according to survivors. This directly contradicts the narrative of Cussler's earlier novel Raise the Titanic!, also featuring Pitt and Giordino as the protagonists, in which they raise the sunken liner, and are able to do so only because the ship was in one piece. According to the Dirk Pitt timeline, the Titanic should have been whole and anchored at a maritime museum during the course of the novel.

Clive Cussler makes a cameo appearance in the novel as himself, rescuing Pitt and the others from the sea in his catamaran, and then helping them in infiltrating the mercenaries' island and rescuing the hijacked research ship.

The climax scene, depicting a planned terror attack in Manhattan near the World Trade Center, is eerily similar to the 9/11 attacks, which occurred soon after the novel was written. The novel was published in 2001 but is set in 2003, which makes this scene impossible.

References
Book Review: Valhalla Rising by Clive Cussler

Dirk Pitt novels
2001 American novels
Works based on Twenty Thousand Leagues Under the Sea
Novels set in New York (state)
G. P. Putnam's Sons books